The El Paso and Southwestern Railway Water Supply System, in the area south of Nogal, New Mexico, was built in 1908.  It was listed on the National Register of Historic Places in 1979.

It is also named, or it includes, the Bonito Pipeline. The construction engineer was Charles H. Henning.

References

Water supply
National Register of Historic Places in Lincoln County, New Mexico
Buildings and structures completed in 1908
Water Supply System